Quevesere (possibly from Aymara q'iwisiña to fight, -ri a suffix, "fighter") is a mountain in the Vilcanota mountain range in the Andes of Peru, about  high. It is located in the Cusco Region, Quispicanchi Province, Ocongate District. It lies south of the peak of Alcamarinayoc and northwest of Chumpe.

References

Mountains of Cusco Region
Mountains of Peru